Keith Schofield is an American director of music video and television commercials based in Los Angeles, California.

Schofield received the "Best Rock Video" award at the 2008 UK Music Video Awards, for his direction of Supergrass's "Bad Blood" video. Schofield's works have been described by Anthem Magazine as "sensations that regale viewers with a joyous vitality" and by Wired as incorporating "visual gags worthy of Chuck Jones."

In addition to music videos, Schofield has directed commercials for Virgin Mobile and Jennie O. The viral video Schofield directed for Diesel entitled "Diesel SFW XXX", comically altered archive porn footage, won a Silver at the 2009 British Television Advertising Awards  and a Gold Lion at Cannes Lions 2009.

Music videos

References

External links
Keith Schofield's website

American music video directors
Living people
Year of birth missing (living people)
People from Los Angeles